The Canadian Collegiate Athletic Association (CCAA) is the national governing body for organized sports at the collegiate level in Canada. Its name in French is l'Association canadienne du sport collégial (ACSC).

National championships
CCAA members currently compete for national championships in the following sports:

Golf
Men's Soccer
Women's Soccer
Cross-Country Running
Badminton
Men's Volleyball
Women's Volleyball
Men's Basketball
Women's Basketball
Curling

Past national championships include:

Men's Hockey

2019–20 CCAA National Championships

2019 CCAA Golf National Championships
October 14-18, 2019
Host: Cégep André-Laurendeau
Location: Sorel-Tracy, QC

2019 CCAA Men's Soccer National Championship
November 6-9, 2019
Host: Durham College
Location: Oshawa, ON

2019 CCAA Women's Soccer National Championship
November 6-9, 2019
Host: Concordia University of Edmonton
Location: Edmonton, AB

2019 CCAA Cross-Country Running National Championships
November 8-9, 2019
Host: Grande Prairie Regional College
Location: Grande Prairie, AB

2020 CCAA Badminton National Championships
March 4-7, 2020
Host: University of Toronto Mississauga
Location: Mississauga, ON

2020 CCAA Men's Volleyball National Championship
March 11-14, 2020
Host: St. Thomas University (New Brunswick)
Location: Fredericton, NB

2020 CCAA Women's Volleyball National Championship
March 11-14, 2020
Host: Cégep Garneau
Location: Quebec City, QC

2020 CCAA Men's Basketball National Championship
March 18-21, 2020
Host: Humber College
Location: Etobicoke, ON

2020 CCAA Women's Basketball National Championship
March 18-21, 2020
Host: Vancouver Island University
Location: Nanaimo, BC

2020 CCAA Curling Championships

March 13-17
Location: Portage la Prairie, MB

Member conferences

The CCAA has six member conferences:

PACWEST (Pacific Western Athletic Association)
ACAC (Alberta Colleges Athletics Conference)
MCAC (Manitoba Colleges Athletic Conference)
OCAA (Ontario Colleges Athletic Association)
RSEQ (Réseau du sport étudiant du Québec)
ACAA (Atlantic Collegiate Athletic Association)

Former conferences
 Prairie Athletic Conference until 1994.

CCAA Staff

Chief Executive Officer: Sandra Murray-MacDonell
Manager, Finance & Administration: Mary Winkenweder
Manager, Marketing & Sponsorship: Brandon Stone
Manager, Communication & Events: Rodney Wilson

CCAA Executive Committee

President: Vince Amato, Champlain College Saint-Lambert
VP Eligibility: Jake McCallum, Langara College
VP Finance: Brian McLennon, Douglas College
VP Programs: Wade Kolmel, SAIT
VP Marketing: Ray Chateau, Humber College
VP Safe Sport: David Laliberte, Georgian College

CCAA National Convenors

Golf:  Jay Shewfelt, St. Clair College
Men's Soccer: David Munro, UNB Saint John alumni
Women's Soccer: Marlene Ford, Conestoga College
Cross-Country Running: Darcy Brioux, Centennial College
Badminton: Michael Kopinak, Humber College
Men's Volleyball: Ray Sarkis, Niagara College
Women's Volleyball: Beth Clark, Assiniboine College
Men's Basketball: Jonathan Lambert, Keyano College
Women's Basketball: Mai-Anh Nguyen, Vanier College

CCAA Hall of Fame

2019 Inductees 
Inducted on June 11, 2019 in Calgary AB
Allan Ferchuk, Builder (ACAC)
Al Bohonus, Builder (ACAC) 
Dr. Robert Day, Builder (ACAC)
Perry Pearn, Coach (ACAC)
Phil Allen, Coach (ACAC)
Cor Ouwerkerk, Coach (ACAC)
Laurie Hockridge, Athlete (ACAC)
Dr. Lana Nicoll, Athlete (ACAC)
Wen Wang, Athlete (ACAC)
Brock Davidiuk, Athlete (ACAC)

2018 Inductees 
Inducted on June 12, 2018 in Quebec City, QC
Glenn Ruiter, Builder (RSEQ)
John Davidson, Builder (RSEQ)
Gino Brousseau, Athlete (RSEQ)
Olivier Caron, Coach (RSEQ)
Pascal Clément, Coach (RSEQ)
Vicky Tessier, Athlete (RSEQ)
Julieth Lewis, Athlete (RSEQ)
Varouj Gurunlian, Athlete (RSEQ)
Maxime Barabé, Athlete (RSEQ)
Olga Hrycak, Coach (RSEQ)

2017 Inductees 
Inducted on June 6, 2017 in Abbotsford, BC
Theresa Hanson, Builder (PACWEST)
Duncan McCallum, Coach (PACWEST)
Joseph Iacobellis, Coach (PACWEST)
Doug Abercrombie, Coach (PACWEST)
Jennifer Wong, Athlete (PACWEST)
Alvin Lau, Athlete (PACWEST)
Randy Nohr, Athlete (PACWEST)
David Griffith, Athlete (PACWEST)
Melissa Artuso, Athlete (PACWEST)
Danielle (Gaudet) Hyde, Athlete (PACWEST)

2016 Inductees 
Inducted on June 7, 2016 in Toronto, Ontario
Peter Rylander, Builder (OCAA)
Diana Drury, Builder (OCAA)
Fred Wannamaker, Builder (OCAA)
Paul Reader, Coach (OCAA)
Vito Frijia, Athlete (OCAA)
Marcy Skribe, Athlete (OCAA)
Frank & Rozika Sulatycki, Coach (OCAA)
Avery Brevett, Athlete (OCAA)
Mike Katz, Coach (OCAA)
Adam Morandini, Athlete (OCAA)

2015 Inductees  
Inducted on June 9, 2015 in Fredericton, New Brunswick
Dr. Carl (Bucky) Buchanan, Coach (ACAA)
Ivan (Chuck) Gullickson, Builder (OCAA)
Jacques Cyr, Builder (RSEQ)
Matt Fegan, Athlete (ACAA)
Chris Hunter, Coach (RSEQ)
Dave Douglas, Coach (ACAA)

2014 Inductees 
Inducted on June 10, 2014 in Banff, Alberta
Don Stouffer, Builder (ACAC)
Alex Hoffman, Builder (OCAA)
Ken Marchant, Builder (ACAA)
Gerald (Jerry) N. Lloyd, Builder (PACWEST)
Wayne Halliwell, Builder (RSEQ)
Mal Stelck, Builder (PACWEST)
John Cruickshank, Builder (OCAA)
Yves Paquette, Builder (RSEQ)
Jack Costello, Builder (OCAA)
Irwin Strifler, Builder (ACAC)

See also
 List of colleges in Canada
 Athletics Canada
 Canada Basketball
 Canadian Soccer Association
 Quebec Student Sports Federation
 Royal Canadian Golf Association
 List of universities in Canada

References

External links
 

University and college sports in Canada
Soccer governing bodies in Canada
University and college soccer in Canada
Sports governing bodies in Canada
Sports organizations established in 1974
1974 establishments in Canada
Student sports governing bodies